Katiuscia Maria Borges de Jesus (born 8 May 1977) is a retired Brazilian athlete who specialised in the hammer throw. She won multiple medals on regional level.

Her personal best of 64.58 metres, set in 2006, is stood as the national record until June 2016.

Competition record

References

1977 births
Living people
Brazilian female discus throwers
Brazilian female hammer throwers
Athletes (track and field) at the 2007 Pan American Games
Pan American Games athletes for Brazil
20th-century Brazilian women
21st-century Brazilian women